Marc Turnesa (born March 19, 1978) is an American professional golfer who has played on the Nationwide Tour and the PGA Tour. He is the grandson of Mike Turnesa, one of seven well-known golfing brothers of the early 20th century.

Professional career
Turnesa's first professional win was at the 2007 Miccosukee Championship on the Nationwide Tour. He earned his PGA Tour card by finishing in the top-25 of the 2007 Nationwide Tour money list. Turnesa had success in the 2008 PGA Tour Fall Series at the Viking Classic; he led the tournament for the entire week until he double-bogeyed the seventeenth hole on Sunday, eventually losing in a playoff to Will MacKenzie. A month later, Turnesa captured his first PGA Tour win at the Justin Timberlake Shriners Hospitals for Children Open by one stroke over Matt Kuchar. This victory secured his tour card for the 2009 and 2010 seasons. A back injury plagued Turnesa after the 2010 season and he spent most of his subsequent career on the Web.com Tour.

Professional wins (2)

PGA Tour wins (1)

PGA Tour playoff record (0–1)

Nationwide Tour wins (1)

Results in major championships

CUT = missed the half-way cut
"T" = tied
Note: Turnesa never played in the Masters Tournament or The Open Championship.

Results in The Players Championship

CUT = missed the halfway cut

Results in World Golf Championships

"T" = Tied

External links

American male golfers
NC State Wolfpack men's golfers
PGA Tour golfers
Korn Ferry Tour graduates
Golfers from New York (state)
Golfers from Florida
People from Rockville Centre, New York
People from Jupiter, Florida
1978 births
Living people